Gerhard Kraft (born 1941 in Heidelberg, Germany) is a German physicist, best known for introducing heavy ion cancer therapy in Europe. 

He was the founder and director of the Biophysics Department at the GSI Helmholtz Centre for Heavy Ion Research in Darmstadt (Germany). Particle therapy had already been performed in USA and Japan using protons, carbon, and other light ions. Gerhard Kraft introduced it in Europe, with two significant innovations: raster scanning and biological treatment planning. Under his direction, 440 patients were treated from 1997 to 2008 at GSI. Therapy now continues at the HIT center in Heidelberg using the system introduced at GSI.

Biography 

Gerhard Kraft got his Ph.D. at the University of Cologne with a study of energy loss of carbon ions in matter. After a two year fellowship at the Lawrence Berkeley Laboratory (Berkeley, CA, USA) under the supervision of Cornelius A. Tobias, he went back to Germany with the idea of using high-energy carbon ions to cure cancer. Since 1981 he started his work on heavy-ion radiobiology and radiotherapy at GSI, and the treatment room was completed in 1997. The last patient was treated in 2008.

Awards 

Gerhard Kraft received many awards over his career, some of which are listed below:

1993 Honorary professor at the University of Kassel
1999 Erwin Schrödinger Award, Helmholtz Association
2000 Otto Hahn Prize of the City of Frankfurt am Main
2006 Bacq & Alexander Award, European Radiation Research Society
2006 Ulrich Hagen Award, German Society for Radiation Research
2008 Federal Cross of Merit (Bundesverdienstkreuz) of the Federal Republic of Germany
2008-2011 Helmholtz Honorary Professor
2009 Ph.D. h.c., University of Gießen
2013 Honorary member of PTCOG
2015 Honorary member of DGMP
2018-2021 Honorary President of European Radiation Research Society

Publications 

With  Klaus Bethge and  P. Kreisler (2004)  Medical Applications Of Nuclear Physics Springer Verlag,

Sources

External links 
 PTCOG: Particle Therapy Co-Operative Group
 National Institute of Radiological Sciences
 GSI Biophysics
 Heidelberger Ionenstrahltherapiezentrum

Officers Crosses of the Order of Merit of the Federal Republic of Germany
1941 births
Living people
20th-century German physicists
University of Cologne alumni
21st-century German physicists